The Workers' Militia was a paramilitary organization in the Hungarian People's Republic from 1957 to 1989.

History

Pre-1956 

Formation 
Following the quelled Hungarian Revolution of 1956, the Revolutionary Workers'-Peasants' Government ordered on February 18, 1957 the formation of the Workers' Militia. The slate-grey uniformed and armed Militia's aim was to defend the means of production. It was a voluntary service, but obviously offered some career advantages. Starting with 20,000 members, it gradually developed into a large armed force (60,000 strong in 1988), although they were never deployed.

The first commander of the organization was Lajos Halas (1957–1962), followed by Árpád Papp (1962–1970), then lastly Sándor Borbély (1970–1989).

On May 8, 1985, the Central Committee of the MSZMP relinquished its direct control of the body, and on June 15, a Council of Ministers took over the supervision and control of the Workers' Militia. The Workers' Militia retained it's paramilitary focus until the change of regime in Hungary, at the end of 1989.

Disbandment 
On November 26, 1989, a referendum was held with the question: "Should the Workers' Militia be disbanded?". The answer was an overwhelming Yes (94.9%), a result which confirmed the previously-adopted law (1989 XXXth).

Ranks

Staff position markings

Command position markings

See also 
 Eastern Bloc politics

Similar formations:
 State Defense Forces
 Territorial Army (United Kingdom)
 United States National Guard
 Territorial Defense Force
 People's Militias
 Combat Groups of the Working Class
 ORMO
 Patriotic Guards
 Worker-Peasant Red Guards

References 

1957 establishments in Hungary
1989 disestablishments in Hungary
Communism in Hungary
Paramilitary organisations based in Hungary
Government paramilitary forces
Hungarian People's Republic
Hungarian Revolution of 1956
Law enforcement in communist states
Military wings of communist parties